Man Is a Woman (French title: L'homme est une femme comme les autres) is a 1998 French film directed by Jean-Jacques Zilbermann.

Synopsis
Simon Eskanazy is a thirty-year-old gay musician. Born into a Jewish family, he took great pains to accept his homosexuality, and to get his family (including his mother and his uncle, Salomon) to do the same. The latter, Uncle Salomon is a wealthy banker who offered him a deal: he'll give him 10 million francs and will bequeath his mansion to Simon only if Simon agrees to marry a woman. First reluctant, he met Rosalie Baumann, a Jewish singer known for singing in Yiddish, she is very observant, and her parents live in the United States. Little by little, while getting to know her, Simon falls in love with her.

Cast
 Antoine de Caunes: Simon Eskanazy
 Elsa Zylberstein : Rosalie Baumann
 Michel Aumont : Salomon Eskanazy
 Gad Elmaleh : David Applebaum
 Maurice Bénichou : Mordechai Baumann
 Catherine Hiegel: Hannah Baumann
 Judith Magre : Simon's mother
 Stéphane Metzger: Daniel Baumann
 Andrée Damant : Bank employee

References

External links

 
Man Is a Woman at Yahoo! Movies

1998 films
1990s French-language films
Gay-related films
French LGBT-related films
Films about Jews and Judaism
Yiddish-language films
Male bisexuality in film
1990s English-language films
Films directed by Jean-Jacques Zilbermann
1990s French films